The 35th Pennsylvania House of Representatives District is located in southwest Pennsylvania.

District profile
The 35th Pennsylvania House of Representatives District is located in Allegheny County and includes the following areas:

 Clairton
 Duquesne
Homestead
Liberty
 Lincoln
 McKeesport
 Munhall
Port Vue
 South Versailles Township
 Versailles
West Homestead, Pennsylvania
 West Mifflin (part)
District 03 
District 04 
District 15
 Whitaker
 White Oak

Representatives

Recent election results

References

External links
District map from the United States Census Bureau
Pennsylvania House Legislative District Maps from the Pennsylvania Redistricting Commission.  
Population Data for District 35 from the Pennsylvania Redistricting Commission.

Government of Allegheny County, Pennsylvania
35